El Pueblo ('The People') was a revolutionary newspaper published in Nicaragua. El Pueblo was the organ of Frente Obrero ('Workers Front'), the trade union wing of the Marxist–Leninist Popular Action Movement (MAP-ML). The newspaper began publication in March 1979.

Published daily, El Pueblo appealed to factory workers and university students. It was published by a cooperative. Melvin Wallace served as the editor and Carlos Cuadra was the director. El Pueblo had a circulation of around 4,000-7,000 copies.

El Pueblo was shut down briefly by the government on July 23, 1979. On January 21, 1980 the Sandinista government banned the newspaper, on the ground of having incited economic sabotage. Frente Obrero had defied government orders for restraint by organizing strikes at the San Antonio sugar mills and Monterrosa plantations. MAP-ML were accused by the government of being 'ultra-leftists and financed by the Communist Party of China'. On January 23, 1980 the office of El Pueblo in Managua was raided and its printing presses and office equipment were confiscated by soldiers from the Sandinista Popular Army. Two journalists and one office assistant were arrested in the army raid. Various persons linked to El Pueblo were charged with counter-revolutionary activities. Wallace, Cuadra and two Frente Obrero leaders (Isidro Téllez and Juan Alberto Enríquez) were charged by the Masaya Court of Appeals, on the ground of articles published in El Pueblo issue no. 159 published on January 5, 1980 (which had argued that the price of coffee had been reduced by the Sandinista Front as retaliation of the plantation workers' militancy, and that the government was not fulfilling its promises of land redistribution) and in issue no. 179 published on January 19, 1980 (which criticized the discourse of the national literacy campaign, arguing in favour slogans calling for the end of latifundio). The court considered the articles as having a 'potentially destabilizing effect on the Government'.

After its closure, El Pueblo was replaced by Prensa Proletaria.

During the National Dialogue MAP-ML demanded that the properties of El Pueblo (valued at around 300,000 U.S. dollars) be returned to them, a demand that was accepted by the government. El Pueblo resumed thrice-weekly publication in 1989, but was then generally not available at newsstands and bookshops. As of 1990, it was reportedly published on a weekly basis but had limited circulation.

References

Daily newspapers published in Nicaragua
Communist newspapers
Spanish-language communist newspapers
Mass media in Managua
Nicaraguan Revolution